Otisco may refer to the following places in the United States:

 Otisco, Indiana
 Otisco, New York
 Otisco Lake, one of the Finger Lakes in New York
 Otisco Township, Michigan
 Otisco Township, Minnesota